The common name indigo bush can refer to plants in any of several genera in the legume family, including:

Amorpha, native to North America
Dalea
Psorothamnus

See also
False indigo

Amorpheae